William Birmingham Costello (1800–1867) was an Irish surgeon, alienist and medical author.

Life
Costello was born near Dublin, and was educated there. He then spent the 1820s in Paris, a student of surgery under Jean Civiale, Guillaume Dupuytren and Charles Louis Stanislas Heurteloup.

In 1829 Costello set up himself in London as a surgeon, specialising in the stone and lithotrity. He wrote journal articles, and lectured in the transient Brewer Street medical school, with John Epps and Michael Ryan. Subsequently, he became medical superintendent of Wyke House Asylum, near Isleworth.

In later life Costello lived in Paris, working mostly as a writer. He died there on 15 August 1867.

Works
Costello edited the Cyclopædia of Practical Surgery, including a copious bibliography; of which 12 parts were published in London, 1841–3. Contributors included Walter Hayle Walshe, and John Gay who wrote on "cleft palate". In his Paris years, Costello was able to complete the work in four volumes (1861), using his own English translations of articles by French surgeons.

Costello wrote also An Address to the Visiting Justices of the Hanwell Lunatic Asylum (1839), and A Letter to Lord Ashley on the Reform of Private Lunatic Asylums (1845).

Notes

Attribution

1800 births
1867 deaths
Irish surgeons
Irish psychiatrists
Irish medical writers
Medical doctors from Dublin (city)
Irish expatriates in France